To the Last Day is a 1960 South Korean drama film directed by Shin Sang-ok. It was entered into the 12th Berlin International Film Festival where it won the Silver Bear Extraordinary Jury Prize.

Cast
Choi Eun-hee
Kim Jin-kyu
Nam Koong Won
Shin Seong-il
Kim Hye-jeong

References

External links

1960 drama films
Films directed by Shin Sang-ok
1960s Korean-language films
South Korean drama films